Qamiyeh (also Romanized as Qā’mīyeh; also known as Shāhābād) is a village in Dastgerdan Rural District, Dastgerdan District, Tabas County, South Khorasan Province, Iran. At the 2006 census, its population was 219, in 60 families.

References 

Populated places in Tabas County